The first USS Halsey (DLG-23, later CG-23), a  guided missile cruiser was a ship of the United States Navy named in honor of Fleet Admiral William Halsey. Originally called a destroyer leader or frigate (DLG-23), on 30 June 1975 she was redesignated a cruiser (CG-23) in the U.S. Navy's ship reclassification.

Construction
Halsey launched 15 January 1962 at San Francisco Naval Shipyard; sponsored by Mrs. Margaret Denham and Miss Jane Halsey, granddaughters of the late Fleet Admiral; commissioned 20 July 1963. The ceremonies included a eulogy by Fleet Admiral Chester W. Nimitz, USN, on Fleet Admiral Halsey's illustrious career.

History
Halsey departed from San Francisco on 25 November 1963 for Dabob Bay and Carr Island to conduct anti-submarine warfare (ASW) system alignment tests and acoustical surveys until 7 December. She arrived at her home port of San Diego, California on 11 December 1963.

Halsey was assigned to Destroyer Squadron 7, Destroyer Division 71 on 13 December, and participated in a special sea power demonstration for the Secretary of the Navy, acting as screen commander from 15 to 18 December. She conducted her weapons qualification trials from 15 January 1964 to 14 February, and fired her first missiles on the Pacific Missile Range on 10 February 1964.

After a shakedown cruise from 16 March to 1 May, she returned to the San Francisco Naval Shipyard on 15 May 1964; and concluded her post-shakedown on 17 July 1964.

During her first years of active service, Halsey experimented with a unique system of internal organization combining all the aspects of the weapons systems and CIC under a combat officer; and separate hull and communications administration departments.

In 1966, Halsey was assigned to Destroyer Squadron 7, Destroyer Division 71, in the Pacific Fleet. On 2 July, she left San Diego for Subic Bay, Philippines. By August, she was conducting air-sea rescue and ASW operations in the South China Sea. During this period, Halsey rescued some 16 airmen in two cruises in the Gulf of Tonkin. On 5 December, the frigate departed from Yokosuka, Japan, for the West Coast, arriving at San Diego on 21 December.

The first quarter of 1967 was spent in training cruises off the West Coast. On 10 April, Halsey left San Diego for an overhaul period at San Francisco Bay Naval Shipyard that continued into August. By September, Halsey was again involved in further exercises testing her capabilities.

Halsey was reclassified as a guided-missile cruiser and redesignated CG-23 on 30 June 1975.

Fate
Halsey was decommissioned and struck from the Naval Vessel Register on 1 January 1994. She was scrapped in 2003.

Notes

References 

 

Leahy-class cruisers
Ships built in San Francisco
1962 ships
Cold War cruisers of the United States